June 1976 may refer to:

June 1976, the month
June 1976 (album) by the Grateful Dead
June 1976 protests in Poland

Date and time disambiguation pages